Jeffrey Warren (born March 11, 1971) is a Canadian author and meditation teacher. He is the author of The Head Trip: Adventures on the Wheel of Consciousness, which The Guardian named as one of the ten best books on consciousness, and co-author of The New York Times bestseller Meditation for Fidgety Skeptics with Dan Harris and Caryle Adler. He is the founder of the Toronto-based meditation group The Consciousness Explorers Club.

Early life 
Warren is from Toronto, Ontario, Canada. He studied literature at McGill University in Montreal, where he suffered a traumatic injury after falling 30 feet out of a tree, breaking his neck. He claimed that this event spurred his interest in consciousness as it changed his experience of the world and worsened his ADHD.

He went on to work as a producer at the Canadian Broadcasting Corporation's (CBC Radio) current-affairs radio show, The Current,

He has authored two books along with articles.

He is married to Canadian journalist Sarah Barmak.

Books 

 The Head Trip: Adventures on the Wheel of Consciousness (2007) 
 Published in 2007 by Random House (US), Random House of Canada (Canada), and Oneworld Publications (UK), and translated into Italian and Korean.

 Meditation for Fidgety Skeptics: A 10% Happier How-to Book (2017), co-authored with Dan Harris and Carlye Adler  
 Published in 2017 by Penguin Random House (US).

References

External links 
 The Consciousness Explorers Club, Team
 Jeff Warren

1971 births
Living people
McGill University alumni